Alberto Malusci (born 23 June 1972) is an Italian former football defender. Whilst at Fiorentina he played in the 1990 UEFA Cup Final.

Honours
Fiorentina
Coppa Italia: 1995–96

References

External links
 International career at FIGC.it

1972 births
Living people
People from Pistoia
Italian footballers
Italy under-21 international footballers
Italy youth international footballers
Italian expatriate footballers
Serie A players
Serie B players
ACF Fiorentina players
Olympique de Marseille players
Ligue 1 players
Expatriate footballers in France
Calcio Foggia 1920 players
U.S. Lecce players
Catania S.S.D. players
R.A.E.C. Mons players
R.W.D.M. Brussels F.C. players
Belgian Pro League players
Expatriate footballers in Belgium
Italian expatriate sportspeople in Belgium
Italian expatriate sportspeople in France
Association football defenders
Sportspeople from the Province of Pistoia
Footballers from Tuscany